The following Union Army units and commanders fought in the Battle of Pea Ridge. The Pea Ridge Confederate order of battle is shown separately.

Abbreviations used

Military rank

 BG = Brigadier General
 Col = Colonel
 Ltc = Lieutenant Colonel
 Maj = Major
 Cpt = Captain
 Lt = 1st Lieutenant

Other

 k = killed
 w = wounded
 c = captured

Army of the Southwest

Army Headquarters
BG Samuel R. Curtis

First and Second Divisions
BG Franz Sigel

Third and Fourth Divisions

Notes

References

External links
 Pea Ridge National Military Park website (Order of Battle)

American Civil War orders of battle
Arkansas in the American Civil War